WTA 1000 tournaments is a category of tennis tournaments on the WTA Tour, governed by the Women's Tennis Association. The old WTA Premier Mandatory and Premier 5 tournaments merged into a single highest tier and it is implemented since the reorganization of the schedule in 2021.

As of 2021, WTA 1000 tournaments include events with prize money of approximately $1,000,000.

The ranking points awarded to the winners of these tournaments are 1,000 (Mandatory: Indian Wells, Miami, Madrid, and Beijing) or 900 (non-Mandatory: Dubai/Doha, Rome, Canada, Cincinnati, Wuhan and Guadalajara).

This compares to 2,000 points for winning a Grand Slam tournament ("major"), up to 1,500 points for winning the WTA Finals, 470 points for winning a WTA 500 tournament, and 280 for winning a WTA 250 tournament.

Events

Historic names 
1990–2008
WTA Tier I

2009–2020
WTA Premier Mandatory / Premier 5

2021–present
WTA 1000

Points distribution 
The following ranking points are as of 2009.

List of finals

1990

1991

1992

1993

1994

1995

1996

1997

1998

1999

2000

2001

2002

2003

2004

2005

2006

2007

2008

2009

2010

2011

2012

2013

2014

2015

2016

2017

2018

2019

2020

2021

2022

2023

Records 
 Active players in bold.

Title leaders

Double crown 
 Winning the same WTA 1000 tournament in both singles and doubles in the same year.

See also 

WTA Tour
 WTA Premier Mandatory and Premier 5
 WTA Tier I tournaments
 List of WTA Tour top-level tournament singles champions
 List of WTA Tour top-level tournament doubles champions

ATP Tour
 ATP Tour Masters 1000
 Grand Prix Super Series
 Tennis Masters Series singles records and statistics
 Tennis Masters Series doubles records and statistics
 List of ATP Tour top-level tournament singles champions
 List of ATP Tour top-level tournament doubles champions

References

External links
 WTA Tour Official Website